Searles is an unincorporated community and census-designated place in Brown County, Minnesota, United States. Searles has a post office with ZIP code 56084. As of the 2010 census, its population was 171.

Demographics

History
Searles was platted in 1899. A post office was established at Searles in 1902.

References

Census-designated places in Brown County, Minnesota
Census-designated places in Minnesota